Thomas Hardmeier (born 15 February 1963) is a Swiss archer. He competed in the men's individual event at the 1984 Summer Olympics.

References

1963 births
Living people
Swiss male archers
Olympic archers of Switzerland
Archers at the 1984 Summer Olympics
Place of birth missing (living people)